Jeff Kropf (born February 7, 1959) is a former Oregon State Representative and fifth generation Oregon farmer from Halsey, Oregon. Kropf served as Chairman of the House Agriculture Committee for two legislative sessions and served two sessions on the Transportation and General Government Ways and Means subcommittees and full Ways and Means for two years. Kropf currently lives on the family farm in Halsey after owning a farm for 17 years north of Sublimity, and has owned several small businesses. He currently hosts a daily morning political radio talk show on KSLM in Salem while also farming in Halsey and is the Executive Director of the Oregon Capitol Watch Foundation. He is the former state director of the Oregon chapter of Americans for Prosperity.

Early life
Kropf was born on February 7, 1959, in Albany, Oregon. In 1995 he married Peggy Sue McCauley and became step father to Peggy Sue's son Cris. They divorced in 2019.

Political career
Former Representative Jeff Kropf, a Republican, served Oregon House District 17, which consists of Linn and Marion counties. House District 17 includes the cities of Sweet Home, Lebanon, Scio, Stayton, Sublimity and the cities of the Santiam Canyon.

He served as Chairman of the House Agriculture Committee for two legislative sessions and served two sessions on the Transportation and Ways and Means subcommittees.

As Chairman of the Agriculture Committee, he participated in the formulation and passage of the 2002 Federal Farm Bill, including provisions beneficial to Oregon's specialty crops and rural communities.

He also served as a member of the full Joint Ways and Means Committee, and was also assigned to the Ways and Means Natural Resource and General Government Sub-Committees.

Over the 2004 Thanksgiving holiday, Kropf visited Oregon National Guard Combat Infantry Troops serving in Iraq, broadcasting live reports and interviews with Oregon soldiers as a member of the embedded media. He repeated that role in 2006 in Afghanistan again with the Oregon National Guard Combat Infantry Units.

Kropf dropped out of his race for reelection in 2006 after learning that his on-air time as a radio host would require his radio station to grant free air time to his Democratic opponent, Dan Thackaberry. Fred Girod was chosen to succeed him by the Republican party, and won the general election.

Awards
Kropf has received numerous awards from conservative business and government watchdog organizations and is a founding member of the New Budget Coalition.

The Jeff Kropf Show
Previously he hosted a conservative talk radio show on 1360 KUIK in Hillsboro, Oregon called "The Jeff Kropf Show." This show no longer airs.

Political Coffee with Jeff Kropf
Kropf currently hosts a conservative talk radio show on AM 1220 and 104.3 FM  out of Salem, Oregon every weekday from 6AM-9AM (pst). Listeners are encouraged to call in, or email the show, focusing on current local political happenings. The show is tagged as “a little politics with your morning coffee”. The show has a recorded segment that airs from 6PM-7PM on the same station and offers a daily podcast of each morning show.

See also 
 Seventy-third Oregon Legislative Assembly
 Oregon's statewide elections, 2006

References

External links
Jeff Kropf's website

1959 births
Living people
Republican Party members of the Oregon House of Representatives
People from Albany, Oregon
21st-century American politicians